State Road 505 (NM 505) is a  state highway in the US state of New Mexico. NM 505's southern terminus is at NM 445 north of Maxwell, and the northern terminus is at U.S. Route 64 (US 64) east-northeast of Cimarron.

Major intersections

See also

References

505
Transportation in Colfax County, New Mexico